Chester Stephen Gladchuk Jr. (born 1950) is an American college athletics administrator and former American football player and coach. He is currently the athletic director at the United States Naval Academy, a position he has held since 2001. Gladchuk served as the athletic director at Tulane University from 1988 to 1990, at Boston College from 1990 to 1997, and at the University of Houston from 1997 to 2001. Gladchuk attended Worcester Academy and then played college football at Boston College from 1970 to 1972. He coached high school football in New Hampton, New Hampshire before moving to the University of Massachusetts Amherst, where he worked as an assistant athletic director and earned a master's degree in sports administration. Gladchuck's father, Chet Gladchuk, also played college football at Boston College before playing professionally with the New York Giants of the National Football League (NFL) and the Montreal Alouettes of the Interprovincial Rugby Football Union, now part of the Canadian Football League (CFL).

Boston College
During Gladchuk's tenure at Boston College, the athletic department's budget grew from $800,000 to $4.4 million. 

Soon after becoming AD, Gladchuk hired Tom Coughlin to coach the football team. Coughlin left before the 1994 season to become head coach of the NFL's expansion Jacksonville Jaguars. Gladchuk replaced him with Dan Henning. In 1996, Gladchuk investigated allegations of gambling by football players, which led to the school suspending 13 players.

In 1992, men's hockey coach Len Ceglarski retired and Gladchuk promoted longtime assistant Steve Cedorchuk. During Cedorchuk's tenure as head coach, he promised more scholarships than the school could give. Cedorchuk was forced out after two seasons and Gladchuk hired Mike Milbury to succeed him. However, Milbury resigned before coaching a game due to "philosophical differences" with the athletic department. He was replaced by BC alum Jerry York, who led the Eagles to four NCAA Championships. 

In 1997, men's basketball coach Jim O'Brien left BC for Ohio State after three of his recruits were rejected by the admissions department.

References

External links
 Navy profile

1950 births
Living people
American football centers
Boston College Eagles athletic directors
Boston College Eagles football players
Houston Cougars athletic directors
Navy Midshipmen athletic directors
Tulane Green Wave athletic directors
University of Massachusetts Amherst alumni
Isenberg School of Management alumni
High school football coaches in New Hampshire